Kim Man-su (born April 18, 1996) is the catcher of KT Wiz of the KBO League. He graduated from Hyocheon High school.

References

External links 
 Man-su Kim on Baseball Reference

KT Wiz
KT Wiz players
1996 births
Baseball catchers
Living people
South Korean baseball players